Cornelius Joseph Connor Dennis "Neil" O'Donoghue (born 18 January 1953) is a former American football placekicker. He played in the National Football League (NFL) from 1977 to 1985 with the Buffalo Bills, the Tampa Bay Buccaneers, and the St. Louis Cardinals. At 6'6", he is the tallest kicker in NFL history. He is the most recent Irish born American to play in the NFL.

Early life
Growing up in Clondalkin, his father Michael played for the Ireland national field hockey team.

Gaelic Football
Playing for Round Towers GAA (Clondalkin), he was described as one of the best juvenile players they produced. He played U13 Football at the age of eight and won an U13 League Final against St Pats Palmerstown in 1965.

Association football
O'Donoghue made his League of Ireland debut for Shamrock Rovers as a replacement for Damien Richardson at Sligo Rovers on 17 October 1971. In his second League game he scored his first goal at Glenmalure Park against Limerick on 31 October. 
He made a total of 16 appearances including two each in the Texaco Cup and the FAI Cup scoring 3 goals.

In February 1978 he returned home at the end of the American football season to play for Shelbourne

American football
O'Donoghue first went to the United States to play soccer for Saint Bernard College. He was awarded the first soccer scholarship to the States given to an Irish person. When the school's soccer program closed, he transferred to Auburn University and became the starting placekicker, after watching only three American football games in his life, for the Auburn Tigers football team. O'Donoghue's 57-yard field goal against Tennessee in 1976 still remains tied for the record for the longest field goal in Auburn history. He received All-American honors in 1976.

O'Donoghue was selected in the fifth round of the 1977 NFL draft by the Buffalo Bills, but was cut five games into the 1977 season after making only two of six field goal attempts. After lengthy immigration problems, he was picked up by the Tampa Bay Buccaneers in 1978. The Bucs had joined the league in 1976 and had compiled a 2–26 record in their first two years. O'Donoghue played for two years with the Bucs helping them improve to a 15–17 by converting 55 of 64 point after touchdown attempts and 24 of 43 field goals attempts.

In 1980 O'Donoghue replaced Steve Little as the kicker for the St. Louis Cardinals. He missed a potential game-winning kick against the Washington Redskins in the last game of the 1984 season that would have sent his Cardinals to the playoffs, and missed three field goal attempts in overtime of a Monday Night Football game against the New York Giants during the 1983 season, resulting in a 20–20 tie.

Even with a host of missed attempts, in 1984 O'Donoghue still tied the long-standing Cardinals record for most points in a season, which at the time was 117. In his NFL career, he had a field goal success rate of 59.3%.

O'Donoghue is the most recent Irish-born player in the NFL.

Personal life

After the NFL, O'Donoghue sold real estate for a few years, then got into car sales. He is currently living in Clearwater, Florida and is a car salesman.

O'Donoghue was the only member of his family to emigrate to the US and become an American Citizen. His older brother, Coli, is a partner at an architectural firm based out of Dublin, Ireland.

O'Donoghue married his first wife, Laura, while playing for Tampa Bay. They lived in Indian Rocks Beach, Florida, and had one daughter, Daeja. They divorced in the late 80s.

He remarried shortly after to his second and current wife, Monica, and currently reside in Clearwater, Florida. They have two children, Neil and Courtney.

References

1953 births
Living people
American football placekickers
Auburn Tigers football players
Buffalo Bills players
Drumcondra F.C. players
League of Ireland players
Shamrock Rovers F.C. players
Shelbourne F.C. players
St. Louis Cardinals (football) players
Tampa Bay Buccaneers players
Sportspeople from Dublin (city)
Irish players of American football
Irish emigrants to the United States
Republic of Ireland association footballers
Footballers who switched code
Association footballers not categorized by position
People from Clondalkin
Sportspeople from South Dublin (county)
Association football players that played in the NFL